Polite is a semi-regular general interest and humor magazine published in the United States. Its tagline is "Generally interesting."

History
The magazine was founded as a quarterly in August 2005 by college friends Justin Peters and Toby Warner. It switched to a twice-yearly format in January 2007 upon publication of its second issue.

The magazine publishes reportage, commentary, criticism, and satire, and specializes in  articles about serious (though unconventional) topics as well as (possibly) fictional profiles and trend pieces.

Contributors
Notable contributors have included Madison Smartt Bell, Peter Rock, Phil Campbell, Steve Almond, Byron Case, Emily Pecora, Bryce Wissel, and Davy Rothbart.

Awards
In 2007, Polite was nominated in the Utne Reader's Independent Press Awards competition as one of the Best New Magazines of 2007.

References

External links
 politemag.com, Official site
 Utne Reader summary

Satirical magazines published in the United States
Quarterly magazines published in the United States
Biannual magazines published in the United States
Humor magazines
Independent magazines
Magazines established in 2005